Boulos Nassif Borkhoche (born Paul Victor Borkhoche, SMSP (7 October 1932 – 4 February 2021) was an Archbishop of the Melkite Greek Catholic Archeparchy of Bosra and Hauran in Syria.

Life
Boulos Nassif Borkhoche came from an old established and wealthy family in Joun, Lebanon, France. He was ordained to the priesthood on 14 September 1960 as Chaplain of the Missionary Society of Saint Paul.

On 14 June 1983, the Synod of Bishops of the Melkite Greek Catholic Church elected him as the successor to Archbishop Nicolas Naaman as Archbishop of Bosra and Hauran. The Patriarch of Antioch Archbishop Maximos V Hakim ordained him to the episcopate on 3 July 1983, together with the co-consecrators Archbishop Habib Bacha and Archbishop Joseph Raya.

Borkhoche was in October 2010 a participant in the Special Assembly of the Synod of Bishops on the Middle East. He was co-consecrator of the Archbishop Nikolaki Sawaf. On 15 September 2011 Pope Benedict XVI accepted his age-related withdrawal.

References

External links
 catholic-hierarchy.org

Melkite Greek Catholic bishops
1932 births
2021 deaths
Lebanese Melkite Greek Catholics
People from Chouf District
Eastern Catholic bishops in Syria